General Cable is an American multinational cable manufacturing company based in Highland Heights, Kentucky, with sales offices and manufacturing facilities in several countries. General Cable manufactures and distributes copper, aluminum, and optical fiber cables which are frequently used in the construction, industrial, specialty and communications sectors. In December 2017, Italian group Prysmian acquired General Cable for a $3 billion deal finalized on June 6, 2018.

History 
General Cable was found in New Jersey in 1927, merging several older companies founded in the 19th century, including Phillips Wire and Safety Cable Company, Rome Wire Company, and Standard Underground Cable. General Cable was owned by Penn Central from 1981 to 1992.

Products
For the energy, construction, industrial, specialty, and communications sectors, General Cable manufactures copper and aluminum wire, optical fiber, and electrical cable products. Low-, medium-, and high-voltage power distribution and power transmission devices are among the company's power cables. Applications for traditional and renewable electrical power production, mining, industrial automation, automotive, maritime, and transit, as well as military, aerospace, and OEM applications, all use General Cable's application-specific industrial and specialty cables. Low-voltage signals for phone, data, video, and control applications are transmitted through the company's communications wire and cable products. [1] Several brands are used by General Cable to market its products.

Corporate information

Logo
 
When General Cable officially formed in 1927, the company introduced its first trademark logo, declaring a unified corporate identity to its customers, investors, suppliers, and associates.

Since the original 1927 version, the company's logo has been modified five times. Today, the trademarked logo consists of the "General Cable" stylized black text with a green "Reuleaux triangle" on the left, which is a modernized version of the 1927 symbol.

Locations

General Cable's global headquarters is located in Highland Heights, Kentucky. This facility, which also serves as the North American headquarters and employs approximately 400 associates, has been operating since 1992.

General Cable operates internationally, with regional business operations in North America, Latin America, and Europe. The company has a global network of manufacturing facilities in core markets, with sales representation and distribution worldwide.

Employees
In 2016, General Cable employed 11,000 associates working in manufacturing plants, distribution centers, technology centers, sales offices, and corporate headquarters for the development, design, manufacture, marketing, and distribution of copper, aluminum, and fiber optic wire and cable products.[1]

In June 2013, General Cable placed 17th among the 40 top midsized (150 to 499 employees) companies in the Greater Cincinnati and Northern Kentucky region. Subcategories included company direction, managers, execution, pay and benefits, career, and conditions.[2]

Foreign bribery 
In 2016, the company was ordered to pay over $75 million to resolve both SEC and Department of Justice investigations into violations of the Foreign Corrupt Practices Act (FCPA) for making illicit payments to government officials in Africa and Asia.

References

Companies formerly listed on the New York Stock Exchange
Campbell County, Kentucky
Manufacturing companies based in Kentucky
Electronics companies established in 1927
Wire and cable manufacturers
1927 establishments in New Jersey
2018 mergers and acquisitions
American subsidiaries of foreign companies